List matches of Polish men's volleyball national team conducted by Daniel Castellani, who was head coach of Polish national team from January 17, 2009, to October 25, 2010.

Achievements

Polish men's volleyball national team